The Carolina Methodist Church is a historic church in rural Nevada County, Arkansas, United States, about  east of Rosston, that is listed on the National Register of Historic Places.

Description
The simple gable-roofed wood-frame church is located in Poison Spring State Forest, along an old section of the historic post road between Camden and Washington, east of the junction of County Roads 10 and 47. It is a remnant of the community of Carolina, which was settled in 1855; regular services were discontinued in 1977.

The church was listed on the National Register of Historic Places] January 3, 1991.

See also

 National Register of Historic Places listings in Nevada County, Arkansas

References

External links

Methodist churches in Arkansas
Churches on the National Register of Historic Places in Arkansas
Greek Revival church buildings in Arkansas
Churches completed in 1871
Churches in Nevada County, Arkansas
1871 establishments in Arkansas
National Register of Historic Places in Nevada County, Arkansas